The men's 73 kilograms competition at the 2018 World Weightlifting Championships was held on 2–4 November 2018.

Schedule

Medalists

Records

Results

New records

References

External links
Results 
Results Group A 
Results Group B
Results Group C
Results Group D

Men's 73 kg